Charlton is a village and civil parish in North Wiltshire, England, about  northeast of Malmesbury and  northwest of the village of Brinkworth. The parish includes the hamlet of Perry Green and the Charlton Park estate. The 2011 Census recorded the parish population as 425.

Manor
Two Anglo Saxon charters and the Domesday Book of 1086 record land in the parish. Malmesbury Abbey held the Manor.

Parish church
The oldest parts of the Church of England parish church of St John the Baptist include the north arcade, which is late 12th-century. The west tower and north chapel were added in the 13th century. Several new windows were inserted in the 15th century. The Jacobean pulpit was made in 1630, and the tower screen may be of a similar date. Inside the church is a canopied monument to Sir Henry Knyvett, who died in 1598. The church is a Grade II* listed building. The parish is now part of the Benefice of Garsdon, Lea and Cleverton, and Charlton, although the church is served by the Braydon Brook team ministry.

The tower has a ring of six bells. Abraham I Rudhall of Gloucester cast the third, fourth and tenor bells in 1712. John Rudhall cast the fifth bell in 1805. John Taylor & Co of Loughborough cast the treble and second bells in 1999.

References

Bibliography

External links

 Charlton Parish Council
 

Civil parishes in Wiltshire
Villages in Wiltshire